Cerro Azul (Spanish: Blue Hill) is a shield volcano on the south western part of Isabela Island in the Galápagos Islands. At a height of  it is the second highest peak in the Galapagos and due to its topographic prominence of over  it is categorised as an ultra. The volcano is one of the most active in the Galapagos, with the last eruption between May and June 2008.

Geology
The Galapagos Islands are believed to be formed from a mantle plume which creates a hotspot of volcanic activity away from plate boundaries where islands then form above it, similar to process that has created the Hawaiian islands.   Cerro Azul is at the edge of the upwelling with steep drop offs in the ocean to the West, while the sea is shallower to the east of Isabela Island.

Cerro Azul is one of six coalescing volcanoes on Isabela Island: Ecuador, Wolf, Darwin, Alcedo, and Sierra Negra.  Cerro Azul is shaped like a large upturned soup bowl and like the other volcanoes on Isabela Island has a large caldera its one at 4x5 km across is one of the smallest.  The caldera shows evidence of collapse following eruptive episodes and reaches a depth of 450 m to 650 m below the rim of the caldera, only Wolf Volcano in the Galapagos is as deep.  The volcano is 34 by 22 km at maximum and has a volume of 172 km3.  It has steep upper slopes of between 12 and 30 degrees.  The shape of the volcano is affected by the sharp ocean drop off to the west where this flank of the volcano slopes steeply to the ocean.

Historical eruptions date back to 1932, but the volcano has had a number of active periods since then in 1940, 1943,1949, 1951, 1959, 1968, 1979, 1998 and most recently in 2008. It is estimated that the surface of the volcano is young, less than 5000 years old and it is estimated that the volcano is about 350,000 years old.  The age of Cerro Azul is similar to Sierra Negra and Alcedo and their positioning is not believed to be related to plate movement over the magma plume but instead an interaction between the plume and the lithosphere.

The 2008 eruption began in May and included a fissure eruption on the southeast flank of the volcano; the eruption in 1998 had also included fissure eruptions on this part of the volcano.  The fissure eruptions resulted in lava flowing  from the fissure.  There was also an eruption within the caldera.  A second fissure opened lower down the slope in early June.

Analysis of the lavas on Cerro Azul show a range of tholeiitic to alkalic basalts that are unlike the neighbouring Sierra Negra or Alcedo volcanoes.

A study published in 2006 showed that there was continuous expansion of the volcano prior to and after the eruption in 1998.  This expansion would have been due to the emplacement of magma into the magma chamber.

Wildlife
The species of Galapagos tortoise on the island is Geochelone vicina, this subspecies is dome-shelled and has an overlapping range with the species on the neighbouring Sierra Negra volcano, Geochelone guentheri, which is a saddle-backed tortoise.  The Cerro Azul tortoises were not affected by the 2008 eruption, although the 1998 eruption did force the National Park authorities to move the tortoises by land and helicopter. Other tortoises were killed in that eruption, either from lava or associated fires.

See also
Volcanoes of the Galápagos Islands
List of volcanoes in Ecuador

References

Azul
Azul
Volcanoes of the Galápagos Islands
Polygenetic shield volcanoes
Pleistocene shield volcanoes
Holocene shield volcanoes